is a passenger railway station located in the town of Namegawa, Saitama, Japan, operated by the private railway operator Tōbu Railway.

Lines
All services, (TJ Liner, Kawagoe Limited Express, Rapid Express, Rapid, Express, Semi-Express and Local) stop at this station. During the daytime, the station is served by eight trains per hour in each direction.

Station layout
The station consists of two island platforms serving four tracks, with the station building located above the platforms.

Platforms

Facilities and accessibility
Toilet facilities are located on both platforms. Escalator (up only) and lift access is provided to and from the platforms.

Adjacent stations

History

The station opened on 1 March 1971.

From 17 March 2012, station numbering was introduced on the Tōbu Tōjō Line, with Shinrin-kōen Station becoming "TJ-30".

Passenger statistics
In fiscal 2019, the station was used by an average of 14,284 passengers daily.

Surrounding area
 Musashi Kyūryō National Government Park
 Tobu Shinrin-koen Depot

Bus services
Express bus services to and from Haneda Airport are operated jointly by Kokusai Juo and Airport Transport Service (Limousine Bus).

See also
 List of railway stations in Japan
 Shinrin-Kōen Station (Hokkaido), JR Hokkaido station with similar name

References

External links

  

Tobu Tojo Main Line
Stations of Tobu Railway
Railway stations in Saitama Prefecture
Railway stations in Japan opened in 1971
Namegawa, Saitama